Livre may refer to:

Currency
 French livre, one of a number of obsolete units of currency of France
 Livre tournois, one particular obsolete unit of currency of France
 Livre parisis, another particular obsolete unit of currency of France
 French colonial livre, an obsolete unit of currency used in some French colonies
 Haitian livre, an obsolete currency of Haiti
 Luxembourg livre, an obsolete currency of Luxembourg
 New France livre, an obsolete currency of New France
 Saint Lucia livre, an obsolete currency of Saint Lucia
 Jersey livre, an obsolete currency of the island of Jersey
 Guadeloupe livre, an obsolete currency of Guadeloupe
 Lebanese pound, the currency of Lebanon
 Syrian pound, the currency of Syria, formerly with the French name

Other uses
 LIVRE, a Portuguese eco-socialist and liberal socialist political party
 one of a number of units of mass, translated as a Pound
 a rating of the Brazilian advisory rating system

See also
 Liver (disambiguation)
 Libre (disambiguation)